What Do I Call You is the fourth Korean-language extended play and the seventh overall by South Korean singer Taeyeon. The EP was released on December 15, 2020, by SM Entertainment and consists of six tracks, including the title track of the same name and her previous digital single "Happy".

Background and release
On November 20, 2020, SM Entertainment announced that Taeyeon was preparing to release a mini album the following month. On November 30, Taeyeon teased her comeback on her social media with the message, "I'll be coming back soon." On December 3, SM Entertainment announced that EP What Do I Call You would be released on December 15, 2020. Preorders began the same day. This marks Taeyeon's first domestic comeback in seven months since "Happy", released on May 4, 2020.

Composition
The digital edition of What Do I Call You contains five songs, while the physical release contains six songs including the single "Happy", which was released as a digital single on May 4, 2020. There are two versions of the physical edition, with each featuring a different cover, CD-ROM design, booklet, poster, postcard, bookmark and photo card.

The EP incorporates various genres, primarily R&B and pop.

Commercial performance
Upon release, the title track "What Do I Call You" ranked first on major music charts such as Genie and Bugs. The other tracks in the album also ranked highly in the charts.
The album took over iTunes charts in 22 regions. It tied with her previous album Purpose and Hwasa's María for the third most national iTunes number ones for an album by a Korean female soloist, ranking behind her repackage edition of Purpose and Wendy's Like Water. The album also ranked number one in China's largest music site QQ Music and KuGou Music digital album sales chart.

In South Korea, What Do I Call You debuted at number four on the Gaon Album Chart with 99,065 copies sold. The album became Taeyeon's seventh top ten album in the country, and broke the record for the largest  sales for a female soloist in 2020 with 89,263 copies on Hanteo. As of February 2021, it has sold over 124,442 units in South Korea, becoming her fifth album sold over 100,000 copies, following her four previous albums: I (2015), Why (2016), My Voice (2017) and Purpose (2019). She's the first solo female artist to have five albums sold over 100,000 units on Gaon Album Chart.

Critical reception

Teen Vogue chose What Do I Call You as one of the "Best K-Pop Moments of 2020", with contributor Hannah Weiss writing: "With its chill soundscape and Taeyeon's airy vocals, What Do I Call You is the perfect soundtrack to close 2020. The album examines loneliness, desire and regret through a soft filter, sharing a touch of warmth to carry us through this winter".

Lim Seon-hee from IZM compared the EP's concepts to those of American singer Taylor Swift and its musical styles to Ariana Grande: "What Do I Call You is a collaboration of seasoned-ness and sincerity, with a wider range of emotions despite the method of 'removing away' without embellishment and excess. Now, no matter what genre she try, she can easily build a flagpole with her name inscribed. Beyond it all, the album becomes alive just by the deep touch of the voice that blows warm breath in the season of the bitter wind."

Track listing

Personnel
Credits are adapted from Melon.

 S.M. Entertainment Co., Ltd. – executive producer
 Lee Soo-man – producer

 Vocal direction – G-High
 Pro Tools operation – G-High
 Background vocals – Choi Youngkyung, Chelcee Grimes and Gabriela Geneva (NIIVA)
 Bass guitar – Taeyun Lee
 Digital editing – Lee Min Kyu at SM Big Shot Studio / Kang Seonyoung at MonoTree Studio
 Engineer for mix – Lee Min Kyu at SM Big Shot Studio
 Recording – No Min Ji at SM Yellow Tail Studio / Kang Seonyoung at MonoTree Studio
 Mixing – Jung Eui Suk at SM Blue Cup Studio
 Mastering – Kwon Namwoo at 821 Sound Mastering

Charts

Weekly charts

Monthly charts

Year-end charts

Sales

Accolades

Release history

Notes

References

2020 EPs
Taeyeon EPs
SM Entertainment EPs
Korean-language EPs
Rhythm and blues EPs
Pop music EPs